Sela pri Dobu is a small settlement just south of Dob pri Šentvidu in the Municipality of Ivančna Gorica in central Slovenia. The area is part of the historical region of Lower Carniola. The municipality is now included in the Central Slovenia Statistical Region.

Name
The name of the settlement was changed from Sela to Sela pri Dobu in 1953. In the past the German name was Selo bei Dob.

Cultural heritage
During the construction of the A2 Slovenian motorway south of the settlement in 1996 an archaeological site with continuous Late Bronze Age to Roman period settlement layers was discovered. The site was excavated in 1998 and 1999.

References

External links

Sela pri Dobu on Geopedia

Populated places in the Municipality of Ivančna Gorica